The  is a mountain sightseeing route between Tateyama, Toyama and Ōmachi, Nagano, Japan.

The Alpine Route goes through Tateyama (Mt. Tate) in the Hida Mountains with many scenic sites as well as walking trails, including Japan's largest dam, Kurobe Dam. Some stations have hotels around them and are used as bases for mountain climbing or trekking. From the top of the mountain, it is possible to see Mount Fuji on a clear day.

Overview  

The route is composed of seven different transportation services using five different modes: funicular, bus, trolleybus, aerial tramway, and walking. Three lines go through tunnels (to protect them from snow), including one funicular railway and two bus linesone using trolleybuses (the last in Japan), and the other using all-electric buses (trolleybuses until 2018), because they do not exhaust fumes in the tunnels. During summer, shuttle buses between Toyama and Murodō are also available.

The  operates most lines in the route. Its official abbreviation is TKK. The word kankō (貫光) was coined by Muneyoshi Saeki, the first president of the company. According to him, kan (貫) means "time-space", and kō (光) means "outer space", while kan (貫) also (normally) means "to penetrate", as in "to penetrate Tateyama Mountains" and kō (normally) means "light". The word is a homophone to kankō (観光; "sightseeing"), possibly intentionally.

Lines and stations  

{| class="wikitable"
! Transfer station / terminus
! Japanese
! Elevation
! Transport mode
! Line name
! Distance
! colspan=2 | Location
|-
| Dentetsu-Toyama || 電鉄富山 || align=right | 7 m || rowspan=2 | Railway || rowspan=2 | Toyama Chiho Railway: Main Line, Tateyama Line 1|| rowspan=2 align=right | 34 km ||Toyama || rowspan=15 | Toyama
|-
| rowspan=2 | Tateyama || rowspan=2 | 立山 || rowspan=2 align=right | 475 m || rowspan=14 | Tateyama
|-
| rowspan=2 | Funicular|| rowspan=2 | TKK: Tateyama Cable Car|| rowspan=2 align=right | 1.3 km
|-
| rowspan=2 | Bijodaira || rowspan=2 | 美女平 || rowspan=2 align=right | 977 m
|-
| rowspan=2 | Bus || rowspan=2 | TKK: Tateyama Highland Bus|| rowspan=2 align=right | 23 km
|-
| rowspan=2 | Murodō || rowspan=2 | 室堂 || rowspan=2 align=right | 2,450 m
|-
| rowspan=2 | Trolleybus || rowspan=2 | TKK: Tateyama Tunnel Trolley Bus 2 || rowspan=2 align=right | 3.7 km
|-
| rowspan=2 | Daikanbō || rowspan=2 | 大観峰 || rowspan=2 align=right | 2,316 m
|-
| rowspan=2 | Aerial tramway || rowspan=2 | TKK: Tateyama Ropeway || rowspan=2 align=right | 1.7 km
|-
| rowspan=2 | Kurobedaira || rowspan=2 | 黒部平 || rowspan=2 align=right | 1,828 m
|-
| rowspan=2 | Funicular || rowspan=2 | TKK: Kurobe Cable Car 2 || rowspan=2 align=right | 0.8 km
|-
| rowspan=2 | Kurobeko || rowspan=2 | 黒部湖 || rowspan=2 align=right | 1,455 m
|-
| rowspan=2 | Walking || rowspan=2 | (15 minutes walk on Kurobe dam) || rowspan=2 |
|-
| rowspan=2 | Kurobe Dam || rowspan=2 | 黒部ダム || rowspan=2 align=right | 1,455 m
|-
| rowspan=2 | Electric bus || rowspan=2 | Kansai Electric Power Company: Kanden Tunnel Electric Bus 3 || rowspan=2 align=right | 6.1 km
|-
| rowspan=2 | Ōgisawa || rowspan=2 | 扇沢 || rowspan=2 align=right | 1,433 m || rowspan=3 | Ōmachi || rowspan=3 | Nagano
|-
| rowspan=2 | Bus || rowspan=2 | Kawanakajima Bus, Kita Alps Kōtsū, and Matsumoto Electric Railway: Ōmachi Alpine Line Bus 1 || rowspan=2 align=right | 18 km
|-
| Shinano-Ōmachi || 信濃大町 || align=right | 713 m
|-
|}

1: Sometimes considered as a part of the route. However, most guided tours use chartered buses for this section.
2: The line runs entirely in a tunnel.
3: The line is mostly in a tunnel and operated with trolleybuses until November 2018.

 Sights 

The Tateyama Kurobe Alpine Route involves many sights. From the highest to the lowest, these sights include the following. 

Located by Oyama peak is Oyama Shrine. Here climbers can receive a blessing and warm sake'' from a priest. There, they also may buy food, drinks, and souvenirs. This peak is better known but it is not the highest point of the mountain (Onanjiyama).

Located on Murodo Plateau from Murodō Station is a shopping area and onsen bath. The onsen on Tateyama is famously known for its use of sulfur spring water for the bath, leaving also a noticeable aroma. Visitors can also find several hiking and walking paths that guide them through Devil's Valley (Jigokudani) and the other valleys. With many volcanic areas in Japan by the same name, visitors are no longer able to walk within the sulfur valley due to gas-related safety concerns.

From April 15 to mid-June, one can enjoy the snow walls named Yukino-ōtani, which tower anywhere from 15 to 20 meters high (roughly 50 to 65 feet). They flank the road leading to Murodo Station, where visitors can enjoy hot, delicious food after walking between the impressive, but chilly, snow walls. There are many charter services from Taipei, Inchon and Thailand during the high season to reach Murodo at this time.

From Murodo, visitors can also reach Kurobe Dam, which stands at 186 meters (610 feet), making it the tallest dam in Japan. From Murodō Station, visitors should take the Tateyama Tunnel Trolleybus (10 minutes), followed by the Tateyama Ropeway (7 minutes), and finally the Kurobe Cable Car (5 minutes). From the last stop, a 15-minute walk will take visitors to the dam.

Midagahara is a flat walking area filled with flowing plains interrupted by blue ponds. Near the bus stop that returns visitors to Bijodaira back down the mountain is a slightly hidden walking path. Midagahara is accessible from Tateyama Station via the Tateyama Cable Car (7 minutes) followed by Tateyama Kurobe Alpine Route bus (about 40 minutes) that goes in the direction of Murodō Station.

On clear days, climbers can see Shōmyō Falls (the tallest waterfall in Japan) across the valley while traveling along the main road from Tateyama Station to the Murodo Plateau. For a closer look, visitors can take a bus from Tateyama Station to the Shōmyō Falls stop (about 20 minutes). From there, visitors can walk to the falls up a steady slope (about 20 minutes). There is a large bridge with two viewing platforms to get views of the Falls.

The section between Kurobe Dam and Ōgisawa was originally made for construction of the dam, while the section between Tateyama and Kurobeko was for tourists from the beginning. Currently, the route is purely a sightseeing one, only used by tourists. Although this is the only route that directly links Toyama and Nagano, it is impractical for normal users as it takes 6 transfers, roughly 5 hours.

See also  

 
 Chūbu-Sangaku National Park
 Kurobe Senyō Railway
 Tourism in Japan

References

External links

 

 
Transport in Toyama Prefecture
Transport in Nagano Prefecture
Hida Mountains
Roads in Nagano Prefecture
Roads in Toyama Prefecture
Tourist attractions in Toyama Prefecture
Tourist attractions in Nagano Prefecture
Tateyama, Toyama